Ernest Frederick Grimsdell (18 August 1892 – 20 September 1947) was an English professional footballer who played in the Football League for Queens Park Rangers as a left back. He had a long association with Southern League club Watford and was capped by England at amateur level. Grimsdell later became a referee and joined the Football League linesman list in 1932.

Personal life 
Grimsdell's younger brother Arthur also became a footballer. Both served in the 1st Regiment of Life Guards and the Guards Machine Gun Regiment on the Western Front during the First World War, with Ernie holding the rank of corporal. He was demobilised in April 1919. Later in life, Grimsdell worked in various government departments.

Career statistics

Honours 
St Albans City

 Spartan League: 1911–12
 Herts Charity Cup: 1912–13

References 

English footballers
English Football League players
Southern Football League players
1892 births
1947 deaths
Sportspeople from Watford
Association football fullbacks
Watford F.C. players
St Albans City F.C. players
Reading F.C. players
Queens Park Rangers F.C. players
Guildford City F.C. players
Chatham Town F.C. players
Dartford F.C. players
British Army personnel of World War I
English football referees
Fulham F.C. wartime guest players
England amateur international footballers